Thaair Hussin is an Iraqi Paralympic powerlifter. He represented Iraq at the 2004 Summer Paralympics held in Athens, Greece and he won the bronze medal in the men's 82.5 kg event.

References

External links 
 

Living people
Year of birth missing (living people)
Place of birth missing (living people)
Powerlifters at the 2004 Summer Paralympics
Medalists at the 2004 Summer Paralympics
Paralympic bronze medalists for Iraq
Paralympic medalists in powerlifting
Paralympic powerlifters of Iraq
21st-century Iraqi people